This list covers aircraft of the German Luftwaffe during the Second World War from 1939 to 1945. Numerical designations are largely within the RLM designation system.

The Luftwaffe officially existed from 1933–1945 but training had started in the 1920s, before the Nazi seizure of power, and many aircraft made in the inter-war years were used during World War II. The main list highlights the most significant aircraft that participated and includes minor types. Pre-war aircraft not used after 1938 are excluded, as are projects and aircraft that did not fly.
Listed roles are those for which the aircraft were being used during the war – many obsolete pre-war combat aircraft remained in use as trainers rather than in their original more familiar roles. Captured or acquired aircraft are listed separately as many were used only for evaluation while those available in large enough numbers were commonly used as trainers, while a small number were usen the Reich Aviation Ministry's list of aircraft at list of RLM aircraft designations and a full explanation is at RLM aircraft designation system. A small number of surviving pre-1933 aircraft were overlooked by the RLM system and just used the company names or designations.

Luftwaffe aircraft
The primary types operated by the Luftwaffe are shown highlighted, with the most numerous in bold.

Captured or acquired aircraft

See also
 German aircraft production during World War II
 List of aircraft of World War II
 List of German aircraft projects, 1939–45
 List of gliders
 List of jet aircraft of World War II
 List of military aircraft of Germany
 List of military aircraft of Germany by manufacturer
 List of military aircraft of Nazi Germany
 List of RLM aircraft designations

References
Notes

Bibliography

 Arena, Nino. Macchi 205 "Veltro" (in Italian). Modena: Mucchi Editore, 1994. No ISBN.
 Arena, Nino. I caccia a motore radiale FIAT G.5O (in Italian). Modena: Mucchi Editore, 1979. No ISBN.
 D'Amico, Ferdinando. "I Veltro Dell'Asso di Cuori. (in Italian)" JP-4 Aviation Magazine, N.5, 1991. No ISBN.
 Dimensione Cielo – Aerei italiani nella 2° guerra mondiale – CACCIA ASSALTO 3 (in Italian). Roma, Edizioni Bizzarri, 1972. No ISBN.
 Di Terlizzi, Maurizio. Macchi MC 205 "Veltro" (Aviolibri 1) (bilingual Italian/English). Roma, Italia: IBN Editore, 1997. .
 Glancey, Jonathan  Spitfire: The Illustrated Biography. London: Atlantic Books, 2006. .
 Green, William. "The Macchi-Castoldi Series." Famous Fighters of the Second World War-2. London, Macdonald, 1962. No ISBN.
 Malizia, Nicola. Aermacchi Bagliori di guerra (in Italian). Rome: IBN, 2006. .
 Mondey, David. The Hamlyn Concise Guide to Axis Aircraft of World War II. London: Bounty Books, 2006. .
 Neulen, Hans Werner. In the Skies of Europe. Ramsbury, Marlborough, UK: The Crowood Press, 2000. .
 Pini, Giorgio and Setti, Fulvio. Savoia Marchetti SM 82 marsupiale (Le Macchine e la Storia – Profili 5)(in Italian). Modena, Italy: STEM-Mucchi spa., 1994. No ISBN.
 Savic, Dragon and Boris Ciglic. Croatian Aces of World War II (Osprey Aircraft of the Aces-49). London: Oxford, 2002. .

External links
 Virtual Aviation Museum
 German Military Aircraft Designations (1933–1945)
 Pictures of most World War II airplanes
 Jet and rocket aircraft of World War II

Germany